The 1965 Delaware State Hornets football team represented Delaware State College—now known as Delaware State University—as a member of the Central Intercollegiate Athletic Association (CIAA) in the 1965 NCAA College Division football season. Led by first-year head coach Ulysses S. Washington, the Hornets compiled an overall record of 4–5 and a mark of 3–3 in conference play, placing sixth in CIAA. The Hornets started the season 4–0, before losing 34–0 against undefeated  on October 23. The loss to Morgan State was the first of five consecutive defeats to close Delaware State's season.

Schedule

References

Delaware State
Delaware State Hornets football seasons
Delaware State Hornets football